Ashley Handley (born 16 February 1996) is an English rugby league footballer who plays as a er and  for the Leeds Rhinos in the Super League.

He has spent time on loan from Leeds at Featherstone Rovers in the Championship.

Background
Handley was born in Leeds, Yorkshire, England.

Career
Handley played for amateur side Oulton Raiders before signing for Leeds Rhinos.  He made his first team début against London Broncos in August 2014.  This was Handley's only first team appearance during the 2014 Super League season, and his next first team appearance was in the 2014 Boxing Day friendly fixture against Wakefield Trinity Wildcats when he scored five tries as Leeds won 50-28.

For the 2015 Super League season, Handley was called in the first team squad and scored two tries on his Super League home début as Leeds defeated Wigan Warriors on 20 March 2015.

Assigned squad number 27, Handley established himself as a first team regular and scored a first-half hat trick against St Helens in April 2015 With the second hat-trick coming in July 2015 against the same club - St Helens.
Handley has been awarded a place in the main squad in 2016 after his fantastic performance in this year's Rhinos treble winning season, he has been given the 22 Jersey. From the 2019 season, Handley wore the number 5 Jersey replacing Ryan Hall.

On 17 October 2020, he scored two tries for Leeds in the 2020 Challenge Cup Final victory over Salford at Wembley Stadium.
In round 17 of the 2022 Betfred Super League season, Handley scored five tries for Leeds in a 62-16 victory over Hull F.C.
On 24 September 2022, Handley played for Leeds in their 24-12 loss to St Helens RFC in the 2022 Super League Grand Final.

International career
In July 2018 he was selected in the England Knights Performance squad. Later that year he was selected for the England Knights on their tour of Papua New Guinea. He played against Papua New Guinea at the Oil Search National Football Stadium.

He was selected in England 9s squad for the 2019 Rugby League World Cup 9s.

References

External links

Leeds Rhinos profile
SL profile

1996 births
Living people
England Knights national rugby league team players
English rugby league players
Featherstone Rovers players
Leeds Rhinos players
Rugby league centres
Rugby league players from Leeds
Rugby league wingers